Marijan Mijo Babić (1 September 1903 – 3 July 1941), nicknamed Giovanni, was a deputy of the Croatian fascist dictator (poglavnik) Ante Pavelić, and the first commander of all concentration camps in the Independent State of Croatia. He was head of the Third Bureau of the Ustasha Surveillance Service, and was also a member of the main Ustaše headquarters, one of the two main deputies of Pavelić.

Murder of Toni Šlegel 

On 22 March 1929, Babić and Matija Soldina murdered Toni Schlegel, the chief editor of Novosti and president of Jugoslovenska štampa,  in Zagreb. At that time, Babić was a chauffeur for the Siemens plant in Zagreb and, according to official reports, he murdered one and wounded another of the policemen who came to arrest him, and managed to escape. Babić fled to Italy where he stayed until Yugoslavias entry into World War II. Italian police considered Babić a very dangerous man who was capable of the worst crimes.

Planning 
While he was in Italy, the Ustaše spent years planning for a genocidal campaign in their native country and trained a small band of followers for a takeover. As early as 1932, Babić, as one of the propagandists of Pavelić, had written:

Concentration camps 
Babić participated in preparations for the establishment of Danica concentration camp.
At the end of May or beginning of June 1941, he went to Pag island, based on the order of Andrija Artuković, where he established Slana concentration camp. Babić also organized the Kruščica concentration camp near Travnik.

Blagaj massacre 

Babić had an important role in the Blagaj massacre on 9 May 1941. Against Pavelićs order, Babić brought several trucks of Ustaše from Zagreb to massacre 520 Serb peasants in the region of Kordun, where they had lived together with Croats for many centuries.

Killing of Serbs in Eastern Herzegovina 

Organized by Babić, Ivo Herenčić, Jure Francetić and other Ustaše officers, killings of Serbs were extensive in Eastern Herzegovina.

In June 1941, Babić and a group of Ustaše officers, on the orders of Andrija Artuković, went to Herzegovina to organize killings of its Serb population. On 16 or 17 June 1941, Babić came to Čapljina. He and other Ustaše commanders had been instructed to suppress rebellions and undertake the complete extermination of the Serb population of the region and settle people from other parts who would be loyal to the Ustaše movement.

June 1941 uprising in eastern Herzegovina 

Babić and a group of Ustaše officers were organizing a struggle against rebels during the June 1941 uprising in eastern Herzegovina.

According to Vladimir Dedijer, Babić was killed by a rebel unit commanded by Dukica Graovac. Babić's machine gun, a present from Ante Pavelić, was first taken by Vlado Šegrt and later by Spira Srzentić. Babić held the rank of Major at the time of his death. His body was transported through Sarajevo to Zagreb where Pavelić ordered eight days of mourning for members of his Bodyguard Battalion. A newspaper in Croatia dedicated a whole page to Babić's "heroic" death in a battle against "Serbian Chetniks".

References

Sources 

 
 
 
 
 
 
 
 
 
 
 
 
 

Holocaust perpetrators in Yugoslavia
1903 births
1941 deaths
People from Nova Bukovica
People from the Kingdom of Croatia-Slavonia
Ustaše
Croatian people of World War II
Independent State of Croatia
Croatian exiles
Genocide of Serbs in the Independent State of Croatia perpetrators
Ustaše concentration camp personnel
Croatian collaborators with Nazi Germany
Croatian collaborators with Fascist Italy
Persecution of Eastern Orthodox Christians
Anti-Serbian sentiment
Catholicism and far-right politics
Croatian military personnel killed in World War II